Pizzo Forno is a mountain of the Swiss Lepontine Alps, overlooking Chironico in the canton of Ticino. It is to be found between Piumogna Valley, Chironico Valley and Leventina Valley. It is in pyramid form and is separate from Pizzo Campo Tencia in the east. It is visible from the municipalities of Faido, Giornico and Chironico. The north-east face is particularly striking which rises nearly 1,500 metres from the Piumogna Valley - this face is best viewed from the village of  Gribbio.

The rock is soft and is subject to frequent landslides. It is famous for its disten and staurolite crystals and for having given the surname Forni which is now common throughout the Leventina region.

References

External links
 Pizzo Forno on Hikr

Mountains of the Alps
Mountains of Ticino
Lepontine Alps
Mountains of Switzerland